Foy may refer to:

Places 
Foy, Belgium
Foy, Herefordshire, England
Fowey, Cornwall, England (pronounced "Foy")
Foy Provincial Park, Ontario, Canada
Slieve Foy, a mountain near Carlingford, County Louth, Ireland

Other uses
Foy (name), including a list of people and fictional characters with the name
Foy & Gibson, also known as Foy's, an early Australian department store chain
Mark Foy's, a Sydney, Australia, department store
Prix Foy, a French horse race

See also

Foi (disambiguation)
Sainte-Foy (disambiguation)